Sixteen nations competed at the 2017 World Baseball Classic (WBC).

Key

Pool A

Manager  Kim In-sik
Coaches Lee Soon-chul, Sun Dong-yol, Song Jin-woo, Kim Pyoung-ho, Kim Kwang-soo, Song Kwon-il

Manager  (88) Kuo Tai-yuan
Coaches (5) Wu Fu-lian, (12) Huang Chin-chih, (27) Yeh Chun-chang, (52) Chen Chin-feng, (79) Lee An-hsi, (87) Chen Lien-hung, (91) Chiang Yi-chang

Manager  Hensley Meulens
Coaches
 Hitting Coach (24) Sidney de Jong, Pitching Coach (28) Bert Blyleven, First Base Coach (34) Wim Martinus, Third Base Coach (44) Ben Thijssen, Bench Coach (25) Andruw Jones, Bullpen Coach (15) Steve Janssen, Bullpen Catcher (66) Chadwick Tromp

Manager  Jerry Weinstein
Coaches Tom Gamboa, Andrew Lorraine, Alon Leichman, Pat Doyle, Nate Fish

Pool B

Manager  (90) Hiroki Kokubo
Coaches (72) Hiroshi Gondoh, (73) Hiroshi Narahara, (79) Takayuki Ohnishi, (87) Toshihisa Nishi, (80) Atsunori Inaba, (84) Yoshinori Murata

Manager  Jon Deeble
Coaches

Manager  (7) John McLaren
Coaches (49) Dave Bush, Jimmy Johnson, (78) Luo Weijun, (29) Yi Sheng, Wang Xiaotian, (71) Zhou Wanbi

Manager  Carlos Martí
Coaches

Pool C

Manager  (11) Jim Leyland
Coaches
(61) Tom Brookens, (38) Jeff Jones, (53) Marcel Lachemann, (9) Tino Martinez, (42) Willie Randolph, (1) Alan Trammell

Manager  (12) Ernie Whitt
Coaches (36) Denis Boucher, (8) Greg Hamilton, (34) Tim Leiper, (45) Paul Quantrill, (3) Larry Walker

Ryan Kellogg replaced Adam Loewen, (who was originally named to the team), on 1 March 2017.

Manager  (40) Luis Urueta
Coaches Jolbert Cabrera, (5) Jair Fernández, (33) Néder Horta, (44) Walter Miranda, (16) Édgar Rentería, (7) Luis Sierra

Manager  Tony Peña
Coaches

Pool D

Manager  (9) Edgar González
Coaches (53) Rigoberto Beltrán, (16) Nick Leyva, (37) Bobby Magallanes, (12) Anthony Medrano, (26) Alex Pelaez, (56) José Silva, (34) Fernando Valenzuela

Manager  Marco Mazzieri
Coaches

Manager  (36) Edwin Rodríguez
Coaches (8) Carlos Baerga, (27) Ricky Bones, (25) Carlos Delgado, (6) Joe Espada, (19) Juan González, (26) José Molina, (50) José Rosado, (22) José Valentín

Manager  (13) Omar Vizquel
Coaches (23) Rouglas Odor, (26) Roberto Espinoza, (31) Carlos Subero, (16) Carlos García, (6) Eddie Pérez, (25) Henry Blanco, (35) Jesús Flores, (22) Omar Lopez

References

Notes
 [* Designated pitchers pool, on active roster]
 [** Designated pitchers pool, not on active roster]

External links
Official website
Results, Rosters & Stats

World Baseball Classic 2017
Rosters